James Herbert Nahrgang (born April 17, 1951) is a Canadian former professional ice hockey player and coach who played 57 games in the National Hockey League for the Detroit Red Wings between 1975 and 1977. After his playing career he coached Michigan Tech for three years between 1982 and 1985. [[He was born in Millbank, Ontario, but grew up in Kitchener, Ontario.

Coaching
After retiring as a player in 1978 Nahrgang joined the staff at his alma mater as an assistant, remaining with Michigan Tech until John MacInnes retired in 1982. Nahrgang was named as MacInnes' replacement and served three years as head coach before resigning in February 1985. During his tenure the Huskies declined each year and also moved from the CCHA back to their previous conference, the WCHA.

Career statistics

Regular season and playoffs

Head coaching record

Awards and honors

References

External links

1951 births
Living people
AHCA Division I men's ice hockey All-Americans
Canadian ice hockey defencemen
Detroit Red Wings draft picks
Detroit Red Wings players
Ice hockey people from Ontario
Kansas City Blues players
Kansas City Red Wings players
Kitchener Rangers players
Michigan Tech Huskies men's ice hockey coaches
Michigan Tech Huskies men's ice hockey players
New Haven Nighthawks players
Ottawa 67's players
People from Perth County, Ontario
Sportspeople from Kitchener, Ontario
Philadelphia Firebirds (AHL) players
Virginia Wings players